The Women's RAF Volunteer Reserve (WRAFVR) was a military reserve force for the Royal Air Force.  It was for women and the first pilot to receive wings was the Air Transport Auxiliary veteran, Veronica Volkersz.

Notable members 

 Joy Ferguson
 Jackie Moggridge
 Freydis Sharland
 Vera Strodl Dowling
 Veronica Volkersz
 Benedetta Willis

See also
 RAF Volunteer Reserve
 Royal Air Force Volunteer Reserve (Training Branch)

References

Royal Air Force